Ruby Speaking is an upcoming six-part British comedy television series for ITVX made by Yellow Door Productions.  It is set to star Jayde Adams, Katherine Kelly, Sam Swainsbury and Joe Sims. Written by Abigail Wilson, and created by Wilson, with Jayde Adams and Lucy Lumsden, the show is directed by Rosie Gaunt-Mathieson.

Synopsis
Working in a call-centre called Hellocom in South Bristol, recently single Ruby is popular amongst other staff, but puts others over herself and over a sale as she struggles to keep to the call-centre script.

Cast
 Jayde Adams as Ruby
 Joe Sims as Tom
 Katherine Kelly as Vicky
 Sam Swainsbury as Mark
 Jamal Franklin as Cameron 
 Nicky Goldie as Donna
 Amy-Leigh Hickman as Ellie
 Dan Hiscox as Craig
 Kiera Lester as Melons

Production
The series is produced by Jon MacQueen, Lucy Lumsden and Jayde Adams for Yellow Door Productions. Ideas for the show were partly inspired by Adams time spent working at a centre in the Stokes Croft area of Bristol.

Casting
In the cast are local actors from Bristol who answered open casting adverts, including Dan Hiscox who was working as a chef in nearby village Pucklechurch.

Filming
Filming got underway in January 2023. Filming took place in the Totterdown area of South Bristol.

References

External links

2023 British television series debuts
2020s British sitcoms
Television shows shot in Bristol
Upcoming comedy television series
English-language television shows
ITV sitcoms
ITV comedy
Television shows filmed in England